Landolphia is a genus of flowering plants in the family Apocynaceae first described as a genus in 1806. They take the form of vines that scramble over host trees. Landolphia is native to tropical Africa.

Characteristics
There are about fifty  species of Landolphia in continental Africa and about fourteen more species in Madagascar. They are typically found in forest habitats in tropical West and Central Africa, scrambling over trees, but a few species are large shrubs. They have simple, glossy green leaves in opposite pairs, jasmine-like flowers with tubes and parts in fives, and hard-shelled, fleshy fruits with several seeds embedded in the pulp. After fruiting, the flower stem develops into a twisting tendril which branches near its tip.

Uses
Members of this genus exude latex when the bark is damaged. The vines have traditionally been used to supply rubber but that function has increasingly been taken over by the rubber tree, Hevea brasiliensis which can be conveniently grown in plantations. The latex from these vines is still used to a limited extent for rubber production. Many species have large edible fruits which are sweet and juicy and rich in beta-carotene. However, commercialisation of the crop is difficult because of the nature of the vines, their need for suitable supports and the lack of knowledge of suitable cultivation techniques.

Species

References

External links
 

Apocynaceae genera
Rauvolfioideae